Gohar Gasparyan (14 December 1924 – 16 May 2007), also known as the "Armenian nightingale", was an Armenian opera singer.

Life

Born in an Armenian family in Cairo, Egypt, Gasparyan studied at a Music Academy in the city. In 1948, she migrated to Soviet Armenia along with thousands of other Armenians from the Middle East. Gasparyan performed at the Yerevan Opera Theatre in 23 operas during her long career, as well as performing at concerts. In 1951 she was the soprano in Haro Stepanian's A Heroine in Yerevan. This opera won one of "Stalin's music prizes".

She also taught at the Yerevan State Musical Conservatory. Gasparyan was a People's Artist of the USSR, a Hero of Socialist Labour and a Mesrop Mashtots order-bearer.

Gohar Gasparyan died in Yerevan and is buried at Komitas Pantheon.

See also 
Armenian opera

References

 Davt'yan, R. G.: Hayots' sokhake: Gohar Gasparyan. Vol. 1. Erevan 2008.  (in Armenian)

External links

Gohar Gasparyan - Armenian National Music
Gohar Gasparyan died, PanArmenian.Net

1924 births
2007 deaths
Musicians from Cairo
20th-century Armenian women opera singers
Armenian operatic sopranos
People's Artists of the USSR
Egyptian people of Armenian descent
Egyptian emigrants to the Soviet Union
Burials at the Komitas Pantheon